Airport Community Schools is a public school district in Carleton, Michigan.  It is the largest district in Monroe County in terms of area.  The districts includes the village of Carleton and the surrounding Ash Township, as well as portions of Frenchtown Charter, Exeter, and Berlin Charter townships.  Airport Community Schools also includes a very small portion of Sumpter Township in neighboring Wayne County.

Schools

Elementary schools
Fred D. Ritter Elementary School
Joseph C. Sterling Elementary School
Loren Eyler Elementary School
Henry Niedermeier Elementary School

Secondary schools
Airport Senior High School
Edith M. Wagar Middle School 5/6 and 7/8

Board of Education 
The Airport Community Schools Board of Education consists of seven members, each elected to a term of six years, though this may be abbreviated to only four years at the board's discretion. Elections are held every two years, with members typically up for election in staggered groups, with two separate groups of two, and one group of three. Vacancies are filled by temporary appointment, with existing members selecting an individual to fill the vacancy until the next regular election, at which time that member may run to serve the remainder of the term.

The most recent election was held on Tuesday, November 6, 2018, in which two members were elected to six-year terms. The next election is scheduled for Tuesday, November 3, 2020, in which two six-year seats are up for election, with a separate, uncontested special election being held for the remaining 2 years of an unexpired term.

Membership
Officers are elected from within the board, typically during the same meeting at which new or re-elected members are sworn in.

President: Will Lang

Vice President: Margaret Hoffman

Treasurer: Allen J. Burger

Secretary: Janice Doederlein

Trustees:

 Patrick Lewis
 Paul Miller
 Julie Missler

References

External links 
Airport Community Schools website

School districts in Michigan
Education in Monroe County, Michigan
Education in Wayne County, Michigan